Charles Orlando Porter (April 4, 1919 – January 1, 2006) was an American lawyer, World War II veteran, and politician from the U.S. state of Oregon. He served in the United States House of Representatives for two terms from 1957 to 1961.

Early life
Born in Klamath Falls, Oregon, to Frank Porter and Ruth Peterson, he graduated from high school in Eugene, Oregon and then went on to graduate from Harvard University with a B.S. in 1941.  From there he went on to serve in the United States Army during World War II from 1941 to 1945.  He then went back to Harvard Law School and graduated with an LL.B. in 1947. At Harvard Law, he partnered with several other returning veterans to found the Harvard Law Record, using the nascent paper to argue for more student housing.

Congressional career
He entered politics when he ran for the Congressional Representative for Oregon's 4th congressional district as a Democrat in 1954.  He lost that race, but he ran again in 1956.  In a major upset, he narrowly defeated incumbent Republican Harris Ellsworth.  In association with Robert J. Alexander, he wrote The Struggle for Democracy in Latin America, which was published in 1961.

When he was in Congress from 1957 through 1961, Porter quickly became known as a strong liberal. He backed admitting China to the United Nations, opening trade with China and halting nuclear testing.   Partly as a result, he was defeated for reelection in 1960 Republican Edwin R. Durno.

In 1980, Porter made an unsuccessful attempt to win the Democratic primary in the United States Senate election, but lost the nomination to state Senator Ted Kulongoski, who lost the general election. Porter made several other attempts to return to Congress: in 1964, he lost the Democratic primary to Robert Duncan, and lost again in 1966, 1972, 1976, and 1980.

After returning to private law practice in Eugene in 1965, Porter was noted as one of the main proponents for the removal of a controversial Christian cross from Skinner Butte in Eugene. He also fought against building a nuclear power plant near Eugene, fought for the decriminalization of marijuana, and was opposed to the Vietnam War.

Personal
He was married to Priscilla Porter, who died in 2002. They had four children: Don, Chris, Sam, and Anne. He died on New Year's Day, 2006, in Eugene, of Alzheimer's disease.

References

External links

Cached version of Priscilla Porter's obituary from The Register-Guard
Guide to the Charles O. Porter papers at the University of Oregon

1919 births
2006 deaths
Deaths from Alzheimer's disease
Neurological disease deaths in Oregon
Politicians from Klamath Falls, Oregon
20th-century American politicians
Harvard Law School alumni
Democratic Party members of the United States House of Representatives from Oregon
Harvard College alumni